The Missing Children's Assistance Reauthorization Act of 2013 is a bill that was introduced into the United States House of Representatives during the 113th United States Congress.  The Missing Children's Assistance Reauthorization Act of 2013 reauthorizes the Missing Children's Assistance Act and authorizes $40 million a year to fund the National Center for Missing and Exploited Children.

Provisions of the bill
This summary is based largely on the summary provided by the United States House Committee on Education and the Workforce, a public domain source.

As passed by the House, the E. Clay Shaw Jr. Missing Children's Assistance Reauthorization Act would:

Support the National Center for Missing and Exploited Children’s current activities around providing technical assistance to law enforcement in coordinating with states and school districts to find and recover missing children; coordinate with state welfare agencies to find children missing from foster care; and identify and recover victims of (or those at risk for) child sex trafficking.
Include educational stakeholders and homeless service providers in the list of recipients of the Department of Justice’s Office of Juvenile Justice and Delinquency Prevention (OJJDP) education and prevention activities. 
Require the national incidence studies on missing and exploited children be provided every three years (rather than periodically, as is currently written). 
Strengthen OJJDP's oversight and accountability and codify current practice by limiting the use of federal funds for employee compensation.
Authorize funding for the Act at $40 million for each of the five fiscal years (FY 2014-FY2018), with up to $32 million of funds being used to carry out the National Center for Missing and Exploited Children’s responsibilities.

Procedural history

House
The Missing Children's Assistance Reauthorization Act of 2013 was introduced into the House on September 12, 2013, by Rep. Brett Guthrie (R, KY-2).  It was referred to the United States House Committee on Education and the Workforce.  The House Majority Leader Eric Cantor placed the bill on the House Schedule on September 13, 2013, for consideration under a suspension of the rules on September 17.  On September 17, 2013, the House voted in Roll Call Vote 460 to pass the bill 407–2.

Senate
Passed by the Senate September 25, 2013.

President
Passed by the President September 30, 2013.

Debate and discussion
When the bill was up for debate in the House, no one spoke against it.

See also
List of bills in the 113th United States Congress
National Center for Missing and Exploited Children

Notes/References

External links

Library of Congress - Thomas H.R. 3092
beta.congress.gov H.R. 3092
GovTrack.us H.R. 3092
OpenCongress.org H.R. 3092
WashingtonWatch.com H.R. 3092
House Republican Conference's Legislative Digest on H.R. 3092

United States federal child welfare legislation
Acts of the 113th United States Congress